Shayne may refer to:
 Shayne (name)
 John T. Shayne & Company, American, Chicago-based woman’s clothier

See also
 Shane (disambiguation)
 Shana (disambiguation)